Dean Clement Evason (born August 22, 1964) is a Canadian professional ice hockey coach and former player. He is the current head coach for the Minnesota Wild of the National Hockey League (NHL). Evason was selected by the Washington Capitals in the fifth round (89th overall) of the 1982 NHL Entry Draft. Evason was born in Flin Flon, Manitoba, but grew up in Brandon, Manitoba.

Playing career
Selected by the Capitals in the 1982 NHL Entry Draft, Evason played in the NHL from 1983 to 1996 for the Capitals, Hartford Whalers, San Jose Sharks, Dallas Stars, and Calgary Flames. He was most successful as a member of the Hartford Whalers, where he compiled career highs with the team with 87 goals and 165 assists for a total of 261 points. Evason was a 20-goal scorer twice with Hartford, and was well known for his ability to get the puck to other players for goals during difficult situations on the ice.

Evason also played in Switzerland, for the Canadian National Team, and in the German Hockey League before retiring as an active player. In 803 NHL games, playing primarily as a defensive-minded forward, he had 139 goals and 233 assists.

International play

Evason first played for Canada at the 1984 World Junior Ice Hockey Championships while in the midst of a terrific campaign for the Kamloops Junior Oilers. His selection to the squad was somewhat of a surprise, but he proved to be a productive player, recording six goals and nine points in seven games for the fourth-place Canadian squad. The Canadians narrowly missed out on a medal to the third-place Czechoslovakian team, losing 6-4 in their match against them that decided the medals. It would be thirteen additional years before Evason was again selected to represent his country.

His final opportunity occurred in 1997 when Canadian national team coach Andy Murray offered him a spot on the roster and the captaincy in exchange for playing a full season for the national team, which was then together for ten months per year. Evason was the only non-NHL player on the Canadian roster that went on to win their first World Championships in three years, beating Sweden in the finals, while scoring two goals and adding three assists during the tournament.

Coaching career
Prior to joining the Capitals as an assistant coach, Evason spent many years in the Western Hockey League in various coaching capacities, starting in 1999 as an assistant with the Calgary Hitmen. He then became the head coach of the Kamloops Blazers from 1999 to 2002 and the Vancouver Giants from 2002 to 2004. He returned to the Hitmen for the 2004–05 season as a co-coach.

In 2005, he was hired by the Washington Capitals as an assistant coach. In 2012, he was hired by the Milwaukee Admirals as head coach, where he served for six seasons to become the team's second winningest coach in their history. In 2018, he was hired by the Minnesota Wild as an assistant coach. On February 14, 2020, Evason was named interim head coach of the Wild.

On July 13, 2020, the Wild dropped the "interim" tag from Evason's title and named him the fifth full-time head coach in franchise history.

Career statistics

Regular season and playoffs

Coaching record

WHL

AHL

NHL

 Season shortened due to the COVID-19 pandemic during the 2019–20 season. Playoffs were played in August 2020 with a different format.

Awards and achievements
 WHL West First All-Star Team (1984)
 Honoured Member of the Manitoba Hockey Hall of Fame

References

External links
 
 Profile at hockeydraftcentral.com

1964 births
Living people
Binghamton Whalers players
Calgary Flames players
Canadian ice hockey centres
Canadian ice hockey coaches
Canadian people of Icelandic descent
Cowichan Valley Capitals players
Dallas Stars players
EV Landshut players
EV Zug players
Hartford Whalers players
Ice hockey people from Manitoba
Kamloops Blazers coaches
Kamloops Junior Oilers players
Minnesota Wild coaches
San Jose Sharks players
Spokane Chiefs players
Sportspeople from Brandon, Manitoba
Sportspeople from Flin Flon
Vancouver Giants coaches
Washington Capitals coaches
Washington Capitals draft picks
Washington Capitals players